Christian Eduard Leite Nieva (born 9 November 1985) is a Brazilian footballer who plays for Swiss club SC Brühl.

References

External links
 Profile 
 Christian Leite at Playmakerstats

1985 births
Footballers from Rio de Janeiro (city)
Living people
Brazilian footballers
Association football goalkeepers
Swiss Super League players
Swiss Challenge League players
Swiss Promotion League players
Swiss 1. Liga (football) players
FC Thun players
FC Winterthur players
FC Gossau players
FC Köniz players
FC Kreuzlingen players
FC Rapperswil-Jona players
SC Brühl players
Brazilian expatriate footballers
Brazilian expatriate sportspeople in Switzerland
Expatriate footballers in Switzerland